Flachsee is an artificial lake on the Reuss at Rottenschwil, south of Bremgarten in the Aargau region of Switzerland. The reservoir was formed after the construction of the dam in 1975 at Bremgarten-Zufikon.

See also
List of lakes of Switzerland

External links
   description of lake and nature reserve

Lakes of Aargau
Reservoirs in Switzerland
RFlachsee